Footloose is a 1984 American musical drama film directed by Herbert Ross. It tells the story of Ren McCormack (Kevin Bacon), a teenager from Chicago who moves to a small town, where he attempts to overturn the ban on dancing instituted by the efforts of a local minister (John Lithgow).

The film received mixed reviews from the critics but became a box office hit, grossing $80 million in North America, becoming the seventh highest-grossing film of 1984. The film is known for its music, with the songs "Footloose" by Kenny Loggins and "Let's Hear It for the Boy" by Deniece Williams being nominated for the Academy Award for Best Original Song.

Plot
Chicago native Ren McCormack and his mother Ethel move to the small town of Bomont to live with Ren's aunt and uncle. While attending church, Ren meets Reverend Shaw Moore, his wife Vi, and daughter Ariel. Ariel recklessly endangers her life by rebelling against Shaw's strict religious nature, greatly annoying her friends and boyfriend Chuck Cranston.

At school, Ren befriends Willard Hewitt, and learns the town council has banned dancing and rock music within the town boundary. He soon begins to fall for Ariel. After he and Chuck insult each other, Ren is challenged to a game of chicken involving tractors, which he wins when his
shoelace becomes stuck, preventing him from jumping. Distrusting Ren, Shaw forbids Ariel from seeing him after she shows interest in him.

Wanting to show his friends the joy and freedom of dance, Ren drives Ariel, Willard, and her best friend Rusty to a country bar 100 miles away from Bomont. Once there, Willard is unable to dance and gets into a jealous fight with a man who dances with Rusty. On the drive home, they cross a bridge where Ariel describes how her older brother died in a car accident while driving under the influence of alcohol after a night of dancing. The devastating accident prompted Shaw to persuade the town council to enact strict anti-liquor, anti-drug, and anti-dance laws. Ariel begins to defy Shaw's authority at home. Ren decides to challenge the anti-dancing ordinance so that the high school can hold a senior prom.

Willard is embarrassed he can't dance with Rusty, so Ren gives him lessons after school hours. Chuck confronts Ariel about her feelings towards Ren behind the bleachers. Provoked by his insults, Ariel throws the first punch, to which Chuck retaliates with a backhand slap, knocking her to the ground. Ariel retaliates by getting a pole and smashing Chuck's pickup. He grabs her to prevent further damage, but she continues to fight – it only ends when Chuck incapacitates her with a final punch, telling her that he "was through with her anyway". 

Ren helps Ariel clean herself up before going home, cementing their relationship. Later that night, a brick with the words "Burn in Hell" is thrown through the window of Ren's house, causing his uncle to criticize his outspoken behavior. Ethel reveals that though Ren's actions cost her her job, he should stand up for what he feels is right.

With Ariel's help, Ren goes before the town council and reads several Bible verses to cite scriptural significance of dancing as a way to rejoice, exercise, and celebrate. Although Shaw is moved, the council votes against Ren's proposal, but Vi, who supports the movement, explains to Shaw that he cannot be everyone's father and that he is hardly being one to Ariel.

Despite further discussion with Ren about his own family losses and Ariel's opening up about her own past, disclosing that she has had sexual relations, Shaw cannot bring himself to change his stance. The next day, Shaw sees members of his congregation burning library books that they claim endanger the town's youth. Realizing the situation has become uncontrollable, Shaw stops the book-burners, chastises them, and sends them home.

The following Sunday, Shaw asks his congregation to pray for the high school students putting on the prom, set up at a grain mill just outside the town limits. On prom night, Shaw and Vi listen from outside the mill, dancing for the first time in years. Chuck and his friends arrive and attack Willard; Ren arrives in time to even the odds and knocks out Chuck. Ren, Ariel, Willard, and Rusty rejoin the party and happily dance the night away.

Cast

 Kevin Bacon as Ren McCormack
 Lori Singer as Ariel Moore
 Dianne Wiest as Vi Moore
 John Lithgow as Rev. Shaw Moore
 Chris Penn as Willard Hewitt
 Sarah Jessica Parker as Rusty
 John Laughlin as Woody
 Elizabeth Gorcey as Wendy Jo
 Frances Lee McCain as Ethel McCormack
 Jim Youngs as Chuck Cranston
 Timothy Scott as Andy Beamis
 Andrea Hays as Bar Patron
 Arthur Rosenberg as Wes Warnicker
 Alan Haufrect as Roger Dunbar

Production
Dean Pitchford, an Academy Award-winning lyricist for the title song for the 1980 film Fame, came up with the idea for Footloose in 1979 and teamed up with Melnick's IndieProd who set the production up at 20th Century Fox in 1981. Pitchford wrote the screenplay (his first) and most of the lyrics however, Fox put it into turnaround. In 1982, Paramount Pictures made a pay-or-play deal for the film. When negotiations with Herbert Ross initially stalled, Ron Howard was approached to direct the film but he turned it down to direct Splash instead. Michael Cimino was hired by Paramount to direct the film, his first film since Heaven's Gate.

After a month working on the film, the studio fired Cimino, who was making extravagant demands for the production, including demanding an additional $250,000 for his work, and ended up hiring Ross.

Casting
Tom Cruise and Rob Lowe were both slated to play the lead. The casting directors were impressed with Cruise because of the famous underwear dance sequence in Risky Business, but he was unavailable for the part because he was filming All the Right Moves. Lowe auditioned three times and had dancing ability and the "neutral teen" look that the director wanted, but injury prevented him from taking the part. Christopher Atkins claims that he was cast as Ren, but lost the role. Bacon had been offered the main role for the Stephen King film Christine at the same time that he was asked to do the screen test for Footloose. He chose to take the gamble on the screen test. After watching his earlier film Diner, the director persuaded the producers to go with Bacon.

The film also stars Lori Singer as Reverend Moore's independent daughter Ariel, a role for which Madonna and Haviland Morris also auditioned. Valerie Bertinelli and Jennifer Jason Leigh were also considered. Dianne Wiest appears as Vi, the Reverend's devoted yet conflicted wife.

Tracy Nelson was considered for the role of Rusty.

The film features an early film appearance by Sarah Jessica Parker as Ariel's friend Rusty, for which she received a Best Young Supporting Actress in a Motion Picture Musical, Comedy, Adventure or Drama nomination at the Sixth Annual Youth in Film Awards. It was also an early role for Chris Penn as Willard Hewitt, who is taught how to dance by his friend Ren.

Filming
The film was shot at various locations in Utah County, Utah. The high school and tractor scenes were filmed in and around Payson and Payson High School. The church scenes were filmed in American Fork and the steel mill was the Geneva Steel mill in Vineyard. The drive-in scenes were filmed in Provo at what was then the "High Spot" restaurant. The restaurant closed in the late 1980s and there is now an auto parts store located at 200 N 500 W. The final sequence was filmed in Lehi with the Lehi Roller Mills featured in the final sequence.

For his dance scene in the warehouse, Bacon said he had four stunt doubles: "I had a stunt double, a dance double [Peter Tramm] and two gymnastics doubles." Principal photography took place from May 9, 1983 to January 1984.

Film inspiration 
Footloose is loosely based on the town of Elmore City, Oklahoma. The town had banned dancing since its founding in 1898 in an attempt to decrease the amount of heavy drinking. One advocate of the dancing ban was the Reverend from the nearby town of Hennepin, F. R. Johnson. He said, "No good has ever come from a dance. If you have a dance somebody will crash it and they'll be looking for only two things—women and booze. When boys and girls hold each other, they get sexually aroused. You can believe what you want, but one thing leads to another." Because of the ban on dancing, the town never held a prom. In February 1980, the junior class of Elmore City's high school made national news when they requested permission to hold a junior prom and it was granted. The request to overturn the ban in order to hold the prom was met with a 2–2 decision from the school board when school board president Raymond Lee broke the tie with the words, "Let 'em dance."

In 1981, Lynden, a small town in Washington State, passed an ordinance that banned the practice of dancing at events and locations where alcohol would be served. This incident received national attention. And since this event happened only years before Footloose was released, the local residents believe that these two things are not a coincidence.

Soundtrack

The soundtrack was released in cassette, 8-track tape, vinyl, Reel To Reel and CD format. The 1984 open reel release was among the last commercial releases on the format. The soundtrack was also re-released on CD for the 15th anniversary of the film in 1999. The re-release included four new songs: "Bang Your Head (Metal Health)" by Quiet Riot, "Hurts So Good" by John Mellencamp, "Waiting for a Girl Like You" by Foreigner, and the extended 12" remix of "Dancing in the Sheets".

The album includes "Footloose" and "I'm Free (Heaven Helps the Man)", both by Kenny Loggins, "Holding Out for a Hero" by Bonnie Tyler (co-written and produced by Jim Steinman), "Girl Gets Around" by Sammy Hagar, "Never" by Australian rock band Moving Pictures, "Let's Hear It for the Boy" by Deniece Williams, "Somebody's Eyes" by Karla Bonoff, "Dancing In The Sheets" by Shalamar, and the romantic theme "Almost Paradise" by Mike Reno from Loverboy and Ann Wilson of Heart (co-written by Eric Carmen). The soundtrack went on to sell over 9 million copies in the USA. All songs in the initial release were co-written by Pitchford based on various songwriting styles: for "Holding Out for a Hero", he listened to various songs written by Steinman such as his work with Meat Loaf and then wrote the first two lines ("Where have all the good men gone/And where are all the gods?/Where's the streetwise Hercules/To fight the rising odds?") in this manner to spark Steinman's creativity.

"Footloose" and "Let's Hear It for the Boy" both topped the Billboard Hot 100 and received 1985 Academy Award nominations for Best Music (Original Song). "Footloose" also received a 1985 Golden Globe Award nomination for Best Original Song – Motion Picture.

Composer Miles Goodman adapted and orchestrated the film's score.

Releasing the music from the soundtrack advertised the film prior to its release. The filmmakers also felt that songs produced a stronger emotional response from people already familiar with them, which heightened the experience of watching the movie. The music video for "Footloose" had scenes from the movie, rather than footage of Loggins.

Reception

Critical response
The film received mixed reviews from critics. Chicago Sun-Times critic Roger Ebert called it "a seriously confused movie that tries to do three things, and does all of them badly. It wants to tell the story of a conflict in a town, it wants to introduce some flashy teenage characters, and part of the time it wants to be a music video." Dave Denby in New York rechristened the film "Schlockdance", writing: "Footloose may be a hit, but it's trash - high powered fodder for the teen market... The only person to come out of the film better off is the smooth-cheeked, pug-nosed Bacon, who gives a cocky but likeable Mr. Cool performance."

Jane Lamacraft reassessed the film for Sight and Sound "Forgotten pleasures of the multiplex" feature in 2010, writing "Nearly three decades on, Bacon's vest-clad set-piece dance in a flour mill looks cheesily 1980s, but the rest of Ross's drama wears its age well, real song-and-dance joy for the pre-Glee generation."

 On Metacritic, the film has a weighted average score of 42 out of 100 based on 12 critics, indicating "mixed or average reviews".

Box office
The film grossed $80,035,403 domestically. It became the seventh highest-grossing film of 1984.

Accolades

AFI's 100 Years...100 Songs
 "Footloose" – #96

Musical adaptation

In 1998, a musical version of Footloose premiered. Featuring many of the songs from the film, the show has been presented on London's West End, on Broadway, and elsewhere. The musical is generally faithful to the film version, with some slight differences in the story and characters.

Remake

Paramount announced plans to fast-track a remake of Footloose. The remake was written and directed by Craig Brewer. Filming started in September 2010. It was budgeted at $25 million. It was released October 14, 2011.

References

External links

 
 
 
 Footloose at The Numbers
 Footloose Review, history and filming locations

1984 films
1984 romantic drama films
1980s American films
1980s coming-of-age drama films
1980s dance films
1980s high school films
1980s musical drama films
1980s romantic musical films
1980s teen drama films
1980s teen romance films
American coming-of-age drama films
American dance films
American high school films
American musical drama films
American romantic drama films
American romantic musical films
American teen drama films
American teen musical films
American teen romance films
Coming-of-age romance films
1980s English-language films
Films about proms
Films adapted into plays
Films critical of religion
Films directed by Herbert Ross
Films set in Oklahoma
Films shot in Utah
Paramount Pictures films